Long Way Home is the debut studio album written and produced by British singer, songwriter and musician Låpsley. It was released on 4 March 2016 through XL Recordings.

Track listing

Personnel
 Låpsley – vocals, drum programming, guitar, percussion, piano, programming, synthesizer
 Phil Lee – art direction, design
 Drew Bang – assistance
 Romans – backing vocals, percussion, programming, synthesizer
 Otto Williams – bass
 Rodaidh McDonald – drum programming
 Tom Coyne – mastering
 Ben Baptie – mixing
 James Draper – percussion, programming, synthesizer
 Mura Masa – percussion, programming, synthesizer
 Luke & Nik – photography
 Charlie Hugall – vocal production
 Paul O'Duffy – vocals

Charts

Weekly charts

Year-end charts

References

2016 debut albums
Låpsley albums
Albums produced by Rodaidh McDonald
XL Recordings albums
Albums produced by Mura Masa